Oscar Thorwald Johan Alpers (28 January 1867 – 21 November 1927) was a New Zealand teacher, journalist, writer, poet, lawyer and judge. He was born in Copenhagen, Denmark, on 28 January 1867. He was educated at Napier High School.

References

1867 births
1927 deaths
Danish emigrants to New Zealand
New Zealand journalists
People educated at Napier Boys' High School
People from Copenhagen
19th-century New Zealand educators
20th-century New Zealand educators
19th-century New Zealand public servants
20th-century New Zealand public servants
20th-century New Zealand judges